Medicines for Malaria Venture (MMV), a not-for-profit public-private partnership, was established as a foundation in Switzerland in 1999. Its mission is to reduce the burden of malaria in disease-endemic countries by developing and facilitating the delivery of antimalarial drugs. Its vision is a world in which these innovative medicines will cure and protect the vulnerable and under-served populations at risk of malaria, and help to ultimately eradicate the disease.

History
MMV was launched in 1999, with initial seed finance of US$4 million from the Government of Switzerland, the Department for International Development (UK), the Government of the Netherlands, The World Bank, and Rockefeller Foundation.

In 1999, the pipeline for new antimalarial drugs was virtually empty. The possibility of profit in antimalarial drug development was considered too low to attract pharmaceutical investment. Malaria was killing 1-2 million people a year, most of the victims being children under five and pregnant women from the poorest regions of the world.

The drugs being used then no longer worked, and the need to act in the face of a projected public health disaster (due to escalating drug resistance) gave way to the launch MMV.

Organization and governance
MMV is governed by a Board of Directors chosen for their scientific, medical and public health expertise in malaria and related fields. Their research and management competence as well as their experience in business, finance, and fundraising is also managed by MMV. The Chairman of MMV's Board is Mr Alan Court. MMV also has a Board of Directors in North America, an Expert Scientific Advisory Committee which helps to identify projects, an Access & Product Management Advisory Committee and a Global Safety Board which reviews projects.

Project portfolio
MMV's project portfolio focuses on delivering medicines that are affordable, and accessible for use in malaria-endemic areas. Specifically, the goal is to develop products that will provide:

 Effective treatment against drug-resistant strains of Plasmodium falciparum
 The potential for intermittent treatments (infants and pregnancy)
 Safety in small children (less than 6 months old)
 Safety in pregnancy
 Effective treatment against Plasmodium vivax (including radical cure)
 Effective treatment against severe malaria
 and transmission-blocking treatment.

Access and delivery
MMV works in partnership to ensure the life-saving antimalarials emerging from its research-and-development pipeline do not suffer undue delays in reaching patients in need. MMV's access team focuses on assuring acceptance of new medicines, expanding reach to vulnerable patients and measuring and evaluating impact and need.

Open source research
MMV started the Open Source Malaria project, which encourages those interested to share procedures and results of open source research.  The Open Source Malaria project received worldwide media attention after helping, together with researchers at the University of Sydney, to supervise high school students at Sydney Grammar School who adapted a synthesis of Daraprim (pyrimethamine), using a less hazardous method to improve safety, to illustrate the ability of enthusiastic amateurs to produce this drug.  Daraprim has been marketed in the U.S. at $750 per pill due to non-patent exclusivity restrictions; the students synthesized it for under $20 USD.

References

External links
Medicines for Malaria Venture (MMV) — official website
Medicine for Malaria Venture's Project Portfolio
Roll Back Malaria Progress and Impact Series
Report of the World Health Organization Expert Working Group on Research and Development Financing
The All-Party Parliamentary Group on Malaria and Neglected Tropical Diseases 6th Report, 2010
The Global Health Case Study Initiative
Global Funding of Innovation for Neglected Diseases

International organisations based in Switzerland
Organizations established in 1999
Malaria organizations
Medical and health organisations based in Switzerland